The Landfall 42 is a sailboat that was designed by C&C Design and first built in 1976. The Landfall 42 was built principally for the charter trade, to compete with Morgan, Irwin, and Whitby’s models, and gained some popularity as a charter boat in the Caribbean. The Landfall 42 was the first example of a trend within C&C Yachts toward more cruising-oriented designs under company president George Cuthbertson's direction, a trend continued with an expansion of the Landfall series during the later 1970s and early 1980s.

Production
The design was built by the Canadian company C&C Yachts starting in 1976, but it is now out of production.

Design
The Landfall 42 is a recreational keelboat, built predominantly of fibreglass, with wood trim. It has a cutter rig, a rounded raked stem, a raised transom, a skeg-mounted rudder controlled by a wheel and a fixed fin keel. It displaces  and carries  of lead ballast.

See also

 List of sailing boat types

Related development
C&C 38-2

References

External links
 Original Factory Brochure - C&C Landfall 42

Keelboats
1970s sailboat type designs
Sailing yachts
Sailboat type designs by C&C Design
Sailboat types built by C&C Yachts